Vladislav Mirvald (1921–2003) was a Czech painter.

A retrospective of his work was exhibited at Museum Kampa in Prague between April 21, 2015, and July 6, 2015

References

1921 births
2003 deaths
20th-century Czech painters
Czech male painters
Czechoslovak painters
20th-century Czech male artists